Fiona Fairhurst, born in 1971, is accredited with the design of the Speedo Fastskin swimsuit. Fairhurst herself was a competitive swimmer until the age of 16 and this provided her with some background within the swimming industry. Fairhurst studied MSc textile technology at the University of Huddersfield, BA (Hons) at Leeds University and an MA at Central St Martins London. At Speedo, she had been working in the role Product Manager Research and Development, before moving on to the Speedo Fastskin, which has been considered the “silver bullet” in professional swimming and has led to numerous title and Olympic medals.

Fairhurst’s innovation was the Speedo Fastskin suit, which was the brainchild of Fairhurst’s R&D team at Speedo. As fractions of seconds can determine whether or not a swimmer wins, Fairhurst and her team focused on finding the right material and design for the new Speedo suit. Their goal was to find a material that reduces skin friction in water, and Fairhurst found hydrodynamic animals particularly interesting. In the end, her team zeroed in on sharks as they saw the little ridges in their skin as being able to reduce the friction that swimmers would face.

After this research, Fairhurst and her team would display their research to Speedo, and Speedo would go on to build a suit with material that mimicked the surface of shark skin and with denticles that patterned the same ridges within a shark’s skin. Fairhurst spent a day in the Natural History Museum examining the skin of a shark under a microscope, to create the Fastskin fabric. After its creation, the Speedo Fastskin was an instant success. It was debuted at the 2000 Olympics in Sydney, where 83% of the medals were won by swimmers wearing this new suit, and 13 of 15 world records were broken by fastskin wearers.

References

British inventors
Living people
Speedo
Year of birth missing (living people)
Women inventors